Matthias Attwood (24 November 1779 – 11 November 1851) was a British Conservative and Tory politician, and banker.

Attwood was the second son of ironmaster Matthias Attwood of Hawne House, Halesowen, Worcestershire and Ann née Adams, and the brother of Thomas Attwood. In 1806, he married Susannah, daughter of William Twells of Birmingham. They had at least one son, Matthias Wolverley Attwood, who became Conservative Member of Parliament (MP) for Greenwich.

He joined the family bank—Spooner, Atwood and Holman—as a partner, and in 1810 and 1811 he became a prominent pamphleteering opponent of the resumption of cash payments, converting publicist William Cobbett, while his brother, Thomas, led the opposition to the orders in council at Birmingham. From 1820, he began to promote and direct numerous public companies.

His campaigning led to Attwood's decision to stand for election to parliament, and he was recommended to the Tory MP for Fowey, George Lucy. While Lucy was not initially convinced, only Attwood was found to be willing to risk the election and shoulder the expense of the canvas. Lucy also believed Atwood would support the government on all matters except resumption, and had no qualms about voting against Catholic relief. At a by-election in 1819, he was successful but, less than two months later, he was unseated in favour of Ernest Edgcumbe without being able to do anything in parliament.

Attwood returned to parliament the next year after succeeding, after an election petition arising from the 1820 election, to take the seat of Callington and held that seat for 10 years. In 1830, he switched his attention to Boroughbridge, where he was elected as one of two members. When this seat was abolished at the 1832 general election, he became MP for Whitehaven, and held that seat for 15 years until 1847, when he did not seek re-election.

References

External links
 

UK MPs 1818–1820
UK MPs 1820–1826
UK MPs 1826–1830
UK MPs 1830–1831
UK MPs 1831–1832
UK MPs 1832–1835
UK MPs 1835–1837
UK MPs 1837–1841
UK MPs 1841–1847
Tory MPs (pre-1834)
Conservative Party (UK) MPs for English constituencies
1779 births
1851 deaths
People from Halesowen
Members of the Parliament of the United Kingdom for Fowey
Members of the Parliament of the United Kingdom for Callington